Jahrome Brown (born 29 September 1996) is a New Zealand rugby union player who plays for the Brumbies in Super Rugby. His playing position is flanker. He was named in the side to play the Reds in week 6.

Reference list

External links
ESPN Rugby profile
itsrugby.co.uk profile

1996 births
New Zealand rugby union players
Living people
Rugby union flankers
Waikato rugby union players
ACT Brumbies players